Târnova is a commune in Arad County, Romania, is situated in the contact zone of the Cigherului Hills and Zărandului Mountains, it occupies approximately 19,000 hectares. The commune is composed of six villages: Agrișu Mare (Almásegres), Arăneag (Székesaranyág), Chier (Kurtakér), Drauț (Doroszlófalva), Dud (Dúd) and Târnova (situated at 44 km from Arad).

Population
According to the last census the population of the commune counts 6240 inhabitants. From an ethnical point of view it has the following structure: 86,0% are Romanians, 0,6% Hungarians, 2,2% Roma, 10,7% Ukrainians and 0,5% are of other or undeclared
nationalities.

History
The first documentary record of the locality Târnova dates back to 1406, Agrișu Mare was first mentioned in 1214, Arăneag in 1390, Chier in 1325, Drauț in 1406 and Dud in 1169.

Economy
The commune's economy is prevalently agrarian, Târnova being a well-known fructiferous area. Small industry and the tertiary sector are also well-developed.

Tourism
The Agrișu Mare Castle dating from the 15th century, situated on the Cioaca Hill is the main touristic attraction of the commune. Chier is known for its pieces of embroidery.

References

Communes in Arad County
Localities in Crișana
Place names of Slavic origin in Romania